7 Series is the second extended play by American rapper Kid Ink. It was released on May 5, 2017, by Tha Alumni Music Group, 88 Classic and RCA Records. It features guest appearances from Starrah, Ty Dolla Sign and 2 Chainz, with production from DJ Mustard, Murda Beatz, Dez Wright, and RetroFuture, among others.

Singles
The lead single, "F With U" was released on April 7, 2017 and the music video was later released on May 4, 2017. Two promotional singles, "Lottery" and "Supersoaka" were released on April 21, 2017 and April 28, 2017, respectively.

Track listing
Credits adapted from Tidal.

Notes
  signifies a co-producer

Sample credits
 "F with U" contains an interpolation from "So into You", performed by Tamia

Charts

References

Kid Ink albums
2017 EPs
RCA Records albums